Alexey Gennadiyevich Chernyshov (born February 24, 1963, in Saratov) is a Russian politician and former member of the State Duma of Russia (2003–2007).

In 1989 he graduated from the Saratov State University. Doctor of political sciences. Chernyshov taught at Saratov Economic Institute and Volga Academy of Public Administration. He was a member of Saratov City Duma in 1997–2003.

In 2003, he ran successfully for the 4th State Duma on LDPR list and became deputy chairman of the Duma Education and Science Committee. Chernyshov was considered possible Liberal Democratic candidate in the 2004 Russian presidential election. His support at the convention was relatively low and as a result, State Duma member Oleg Malyshkin was nominated from LDPR.

References

1963 births
Living people
Politicians from Saratov
Fourth convocation members of the State Duma (Russian Federation)
Liberal Democratic Party of Russia politicians